Costruzioni Italiane Serrature e Affini, also known by the acronym CISA, is an Italian manufacturer of locking and access control systems.

History
Costruzioni Italiane Serrature e Affini was founded in Florence, by Luigi Bucci in 1926. The company  is part of Allegion.

CISA is present worldwide in over 70 countries.

From 2 December 2013 CISA became part of the new Allegion group, which includes international brands in the security technology sector.

CISA is present in Italy with offices in Faenza and Monsampolo del Tronto. The Monsampolo office specializes in the production of keys and cylinders.

References

Lock manufacturers
Manufacturing companies of Italy
Manufacturing companies established in 1926
Italian brands